Jeremy Ben-Ami (born 1962) is the President of J Street, a liberal advocacy organization in the United States dedicated to promoting American leadership to end the Arab-Israeli and Israel-Palestinian conflicts peacefully and diplomatically. He is also the executive director of JStreetPAC, which endorses and raises money for federal candidates.

Early life and education
Ben-Ami grew up in New York City. He is the son of the late Eve and the late Yitshaq Ben-Ami. His father was born in Mandatory Palestine, but moved to the United States. Ben-Ami grew up in a Jewish home and became Bar Mitzvah at Temple Rodeph Sholom in Manhattan. He attended Collegiate School, also in Manhattan.

He graduated from Princeton University and received a law degree from New York University.

Career
Ben-Ami was President Bill Clinton's Deputy Domestic Policy Adviser, and later Policy Director on Howard Dean's presidential campaign. He was most recently Senior Vice President at Fenton Communications. Earlier he was the Communications Director for the New Israel Fund and started the Israeli firm Ben-Or Communications while living in Israel in the late 1990s. Ben-Ami has worked with Jewish peace groups, including the Center for Middle East Peace and the Geneva Initiative-North America.

Viewpoints
In March 2011, Ben-Ami commented,

Ben-Ami's 2011 book A New Voice for Israel articulates a philosophy and an agenda for pro-Zionist, pro-peace Judaism based on religious and humanist values. He argues for a two-state solution and for U.S. efforts to promote the same. He also analyzes the dynamics and politics of Israel in the U.S. Jewish community. Reviewing the book, Sari Nusseibeh wrote "Ben-Ami provides an arsenal of logistical and moral arguments stressing that not only is Israel's occupation over another people a threat to the Zionist dream and American interests in the region, but that it also runs counter to rabbinic values....". Abraham J. Edelheit found the book's thesis to be one that Peter Beinart has already discussed, and that while he offers convincing evidence that Israeli policies are alienating young Jewish Americans, he fails to "explain how J Street will achieve anything but cementing their criticism of Israel. ".  Joseph Finlay, reviewing for Jewish Quarterly, wrote that Ben-Ami's critique of contemporary American Jewish leadership is 'entirely unoriginal' and gentle and that instead it is necessary to create "massive pressure on Israel to end the occupation, both directly and via national governments across the world. It needs to harness the energy of BDS and pro-Palestinian activists".

Personal
Ben-Ami married Alisa Biran in 2001. Biran, who was working in fundraising at a music school, happened to be the daughter of a cantor from Ben-Ami's childhood synagogue.

References

External links

Jeremy Ben-Ami blog archives at The Huffington Post
Staff biography at J Street

A New Voice for Israel official book site at Macmillan
Ben-Ami, Jeremy Tel Aviv, Then and Now The New York Times, April 9, 2009
Articles
Goldberg, Michelle Same As It Ever Was? The American Prospect, April 7, 2009
Traub, James The New Israel Lobby, The New York Times, September 9, 2009
Jacobson, Louis A moment with ... Jeremy Ben-Ami '84, on speaking out about Israel, Princeton Alumni Weekly October 7, 2009
Goldberg, Jeffrey. J Street's Ben-Ami on Zionism and Military Aid to Israel, The Atlantic, October 23, 2009.
Katz, Mandy The Man on J Street: The Story of Jeremy Ben-Ami, Moment, March/April 2010.
 Hoffman, Allison. Heads Up: J Street chief Jeremy Ben-Ami calls the plays for the first self-confident alternative Jewish establishment, Tablet Magazine, October 28, 2010.
 Kirsch, Jonathan. The J Street Zionist, The Jewish Journal of Greater Los Angeles, November 17, 2011.
 Shabad, Rebecca. A DC Voice for a Two-State Solution, The Hill, March 4, 2014.

1962 births
Living people
American emigrants to Israel
American lobbyists
American Zionists
Date of birth missing (living people)
New York University School of Law alumni
Princeton University alumni
Zionism in the United States
Collegiate School (New York) alumni